Adrian L. "Bink" Beamer (February 5, 1923 – August 20, 2008) was an American football coach and college athletics administrator. He served as the head football coach at Central Washington University from 1961 to 1962, compiling a record of 11–6–1.  Beamer was also the school's athletic director from 1963 to 1983. Beamer played college football at Eastern Washington University in Cheney, Washington, where he lettered in 1941 and 1942.

Head coaching record

References

1923 births
2008 deaths
Central Washington Wildcats athletic directors
Central Washington Wildcats football coaches
Eastern Washington Eagles football players
People from Grove, Oklahoma
Players of American football from Oklahoma